Prunus pendula can refer to:

Prunus pendula , a synonym of Prunus campanulata 
Prunus pendula , a synonym of Prunus cerasus 
Prunus pendula , a synonym of Prunus itosakura 
Prunus pendula , also a synonym of Prunus itosakura